Cobra Woman is a 1944 American South Seas adventure film from Universal Pictures, directed by Robert Siodmak that stars Maria Montez, Jon Hall, and Sabu. Shot in Technicolor, this film is typical of Montez's career at Universal, and, although mostly forgotten today by the general public, is venerated by film buffs as a camp classic for its legendary phallic snake-dance and Montez's words: "Geev me that Cobra jewl (sic)".

Avant-garde filmmaker Kenneth Anger has called it his favorite film. Film critic Leonard Maltin gave the film three stars out of four and called it a camp classic.

Plot
The beautiful Tollea is abducted and taken to Cobra Island, where she discovers that the Queen is her grandmother. Hava warns the angered Ramu not to go after her, but he sets sail for the forbidden island, with his young friend Kado accompanying him as a stowaway.

A panther attacks Ramu, who is saved by a dart from Kado's deadly blowgun. They continue the search for Tollea, unaware that the high priestess of the island is Naja, her twin sister. The queen has ordered Tollea to be forcibly returned to Cobra Island only so she can displace her evil sister.

Ramu mistakenly becomes involved with Naja, who falls in love with him. Kado is captured and tortured by the brutal Martok, but refuses to reveal Ramu's whereabouts. Martok proceeds to murder the Queen.

When they finally meet, Naja attempts to kill her sister with a spear, but plunges to her own death instead. The evil Martok insists that Tollea perform a forbidden cobra dance, whereupon the island's volcano begins to violently erupt. It ceases when Martok is killed by Hava. When Ramu is about to return home, Tollea asks him to remain by her side and help her rule Cobra Island.

Cast
 Maria Montez as Tollea/Naja
 Jon Hall as Ramu
 Sabu as Kado
 Edgar Barrier as Martok
 Mary Nash as the Queen
 Lois Collier as Veeda
 Samuel S. Hinds as Father Paul
 Moroni Olsen as MacDonald
 Lon Chaney, Jr. as Hava (billed as Lon Chaney)

Production
Universal announced the film in June 1942 starring Montez, Hall, and Sabu, even before shooting had begun on their production of Arabian Nights. It was meant to follow that film but was pre-empted by White Savage.

Filming took place in May 1943.

Siodmak later called the film "silly but fun...Montez couldn't act from here to there but she was a great personality and completely believed in her roles: if she was playing a princess you had to treat her like one all through lunch but if she was a slave girl you could kick her around anyhow and she wouldn't object: Method Acting before its time you might say."

Critical reception
A contemporary review of the film by Bosley Crowther in The New York Times reported that "the submissive audience is witchingly rocked to sleep with as wacky an adventure fable as was ever dished up outside the comic strips." He also wrote that Cobra Island "is ruled by a viperous doll who snake-dances in the sacred temple, surrounded by a bevy of night-gowned toots," that "Miss Montez plays dual roles — those of the good twin and the bad twin — without a trace of distinction between," and that the film "is better than the funny papers, on which it was obviously based." Writing in AllMovie, critic Hans Wollstein described the film as "the quintessential romantic Montez-John Hall melodrama," "Hollywood escapism at its zenith," and "a rather choice slice of cinematic ham." A description of the film at Turner Classic Movies notes that "the absurdity of the plot of Cobra Woman was a source of creative inspiration for such diverse individuals as theatrical producer Charles Ludlam of the Ridiculous Theatrical Company and novelist Gore Vidal.

In popular culture
Universal's theatrical release poster can be seen in the 2013 film Mama.

See also
List of American films of 1944

References

External links

 
 
 
 
Review of film at Variety
Review of film at Variety

1944 films
1944 romantic drama films
1940s adventure drama films
Films directed by Robert Siodmak
Universal Pictures films
American romantic drama films
Films about twin sisters
American adventure drama films
1940s English-language films
1940s American films